Sidera Lodoicea  is the name given by the astronomer Giovanni Domenico Cassini to the four moons of Saturn discovered by him in the years 1671, 1672, and 1684 and published in his Découverte de deux nouvelles planètes autour de Saturne in 1673 and in the Journal des sçavans in 1686. These satellites are today known by the following names, given in 1847:

 Iapetus or Saturn VIII, discovered October 25, 1671
 Rhea or Saturn V, discovered December 23, 1672
 Tethys or Saturn III, discovered March 21, 1684
 Dione or Saturn IV, discovered March 21, 1684

The name Sidera Lodoicea means "Louisian Stars", from Latin sidus "star" and Lodoiceus, a nonce adjective coined from Lodoicus, one of several Latin forms of the French name Louis (reflecting an older form, Lodhuwig).  Cassini intended the name to honor King Louis XIV of France, who reigned from 1643 to 1715, and who was Cassini's benefactor as patron of the Paris Observatory, of which Cassini was the director.

The name was modelled on Sidera Medicea, "Medicean stars", the Latin name used by Galileo to name the four Galilean satellites of Jupiter, in honor of the Florentine house of Medici.

The following contemporary (1686) notice records Cassini's choice of name, and explains his rationale for the same:

Notes

References 

 

History of astronomy
Moons of Saturn
Discoveries by Giovanni Domenico Cassini